Career Girl is a 1944 American musical film directed by Wallace Fox and starring Frances Langford. It was PRC's answer to Columbia's Cover Girl.

This film is in the public domain.

Plot summary 
Kansas City girl Joan Terry has come to New York to conquer Broadway as thousands have before her.  Advised to maintain an appearance of wealth, she has been living in an expensive hotel until she is discovered.  With no offers coming in she moves to an economical women's boarding house full of equally unsuccessful actresses, singers, and dancers.

However, when Joan demonstrates her ability in the traditional newcomer's show for the residents, the girls recognise her considerable talent and form a corporation to support her until she is discovered and can pay them back from her earnings.

Joan has a further problem when her impatient fiancée, a Kansas City coal mines owner, orders her to return home in failure to become his meek housewife.  When she carries on in her plans, he arrives in New York to sabotage her aspiring career.

Cast 
 Frances Langford as Joan Terry
 Edward Norris as Steve Dexter
 Iris Adrian as Glenda Benton
 Craig Woods as James Blake
 Linda Brent as Thelma Mason
 Alec Craig as Theodore "Pop" Billings, the Landlord
 Ariel Heath as Sue Collins
 Lorraine Krueger as Ann
 Gladys Blake as Janie
 Charles Judels as Felix Black
 Charles Williams as Louis Horton
 Renee Helms as Polly
 Marcy McGuire as Louise

Soundtrack 
 Frances Langford - "That's How the Rumba Began" (By Morey Amsterdam and Tony Romano)
 Frances Langford - "Some Day" (By Morey Amsterdam and Tony Romano)
 Frances Langford - "Blue in Love Again" (Written by Michael Breen and Sam Neuman)
 Frances Langford - "A Dream Came True" (Written by Michael Breen and Sam Neuman)
 Tap danced to by Lorraine Krueger - "Buck Dance" (traditional stop-time tune for tap dance)

See also
List of American films of 1944

References

External links 

 
 
 

1944 films
American musical films
American black-and-white films
1944 musical films
Films directed by Wallace Fox
Producers Releasing Corporation films
1940s English-language films
1940s American films